Marion High School is a high school in Marion, Indiana with more than 1,000 students.

History 
Marion High School's first campus opened in September 1891. Unfortunately, in 1902 the building burned to the ground. The next building stood only for six years, but it was burned down again in 1908 by a possible arson attack. The second campus opened in 1910 on West Nelson Street where it would remain open until 1975. 

Marion High School's current campus opened for the 1962–1963 school year on 26th Street as "Marion Senior High School South Campus". The school was split into two campuses, North & South. But, the North campus was closed for the 1964–1965 school year and would become a junior high school for the 1966–1967 school year. Plans began early for the next parts of Marion High School's South Campus. A total of $1,225,000 was appropriated for the building of a kitchen and cafeteria building and the building of a vocational unit. Bids opened for both of these parts, along with a second academic unit, on October 10, 1962 ("$1.2 Million Approved For New School Unit" 1).

The second academic unit, or "Building Two," was under construction but not finished for the 1963–1964 school year. It would open for the 1964–1965 school year. On May 2, 1968, Marion High School opened the Physical Education wing. It was built on with an extension of "Building Two" with ten additional classrooms and a planetarium that was completed in 1969. 

In late-1968 the school district decided to add another necessary addition to campus. The Auditorium wing was set to open for the 1970–1971 school year. But because of a brutally cold winter, the opening was set back to the 1971–1972 school year. The Auditorium has become one of the most important parts of the school and the city. 

For the 2000–2001 school year, the entire school district received an overhaul. Marion High school was refurbished, a new elementary school opened, and the district's feeder system was changed. Beforehand, the elementary schools served kindergarten through sixth grade, the junior high schools served seventh through ninth grades, and Marion High School served tenth through twelfth grades. Since September 5, 2000, the elementary schools serve kindergarten through fourth grade, the junior high schools were relabeled into middle schools and now serve fifth through eighth grades, Marion High school now serves ninth through twelfth grades.

Athletics 
The name of the students and the athletic teams is the "Giants", and their teams compete in Indiana's North Central Conference. The school is best known for its basketball teams, which have won eight IHSAA state championships. Former Marion basketball coach Bill Green holds the state record with six state championships, of which the back-to-back-to-back crowns of '85, '86 and '87 became known as “Purple Reign”.

Performing arts 
MHS' swing choir, "26th Street Singers", won the 1975 Bishop Luers High School Swing Choir Invitational, regarded by some as the first true show choir competition. They also took home top honors in the 1976 and 1977 editions of the event.

Notable alumni 
 James Blackmon Sr, Former University of Kentucky basketball player
 James Blackmon Jr., former Indiana University basketball and NBA player
 Jay Edwards, Indiana University and NBA basketball 
 Ralph Isselhardt, American football player
 Zach Randolph, former Michigan State University basketball player; retired professional basketball player and two time NBA all star
Ann Vermilion, member of the Indiana House of Representatives

See also
 List of high schools in Indiana

References

External links 
 Marion Community Schools, Marion, Indiana

Public high schools in Indiana
Schools in Grant County, Indiana
Marion, Indiana
1891 establishments in Indiana